Hardin Barry (March 26, 1891 – November 5, 1969), nicknamed "Finn", was an American Major League Baseball pitcher for one season prior to a lifetime career in law.

History
Born in Susanville, California, he started his career at Santa Clara University then called Santa Clara College. After graduation in 1912 he had a one-season career in the majors for the Philadelphia Athletics during the  season.  He went directly to the majors with no minor career, yet played in only three games, earning a 7.62 Earned Run Average (ERA).

He studied law under his father, and on March 1, 1918, he won his first case at Judge Koken's court at Standish. He worked as an attorney in Susanville.
He was considered the "Dean of Lassen County Bar"  when he died in Carson City, Nevada on November 5, 1969, during a visit to a daughter.

References

Further reading

Major League Baseball pitchers
Philadelphia Athletics players
Baseball players from California
1891 births
1969 deaths
People from Susanville, California